Syedna Musa Kalimuddin Bin Syedna Zakiuddin (died on 22 Rabi ul Akhir 1122 AH/June 20, 1710/1711), Jamnagar, India) was the 36th Da'i al-Mutlaq (Absolute Missionary) of the Dawoodi Bohra sect of Islam. He succeeded the 35th Da'i Syedna Abduttayyeb Zakiuddin, to the religious post. His period of Dawat was from 1110–1122 AH/ 1692–1711 AD.

Family
Syedna Musa was born during the tenure of Syedna Ismail Badruddin I to Syedna Abduttayyeb Zakiuddin II and Fatema AaiSaheba. His brother was Syedi Shaikh Adam Safiyuddin and his son Syedna Noor Mohammad Nooruddin was his successor. Syedna Musa Kalimuddin was from the Moulaya Tarmal/Bharmal family.

Life
Syedna Ismail Badruddin I imparted knowledge to Syedna Musa. Syedna Musa was later educated in the religious institution headed by Syedi Khanji Feer. Syedna Musa played an active role in administration after his father succeeded as Dai.

Syedna Musa Kalimuddin became Da'i al-Mutlaq in 1110 AH /1692 AD.

He was extremely distressed due to harassment of the ruler of Jamnagar which made his health deteriorate rapidly.

Succession
He appointed Syedna Noor Mohammad Nooruddin as his successor in Ahmedabad during his visit and also at his deathbed.

He is buried in Jamnagar, India.

References

Further reading
Daftary, Farhad, The Ismaili, Their History and Doctrine (Chapter -Mustalian Ismailism- p. 300-310)
Lathan, Young, Religion, Learning and Science
Bacharach, Joseph W. Meri, Medieval Islamic Civilisation

Dawoodi Bohra da'is
1711 deaths
Year of birth unknown
17th-century Ismailis
18th-century Ismailis